Filizli can refer to:

 Filizli, Göle
 Filizli, Olur